Hunger Hill is a small village  from the centre of Wrightington, in West Lancashire, England. It is described as a rural settlement. It gets its name from the Second English Civil War when royalist soldiers stopped in the village for supplies.

References

Villages in Lancashire
Geography of the Borough of West Lancashire